Heliconia impudica is a species of plant in the family Heliconiaceae. It is endemic to Ecuador.

References

External links
 Heliconia impudica observations on iNaturalist

Flora of Ecuador
impudica